Mark Nicolson is an American tenor opera singer residing in New York City.

Mark Nicolson was born in Galesburg, Illinois and grew up in Peoria, Illinois, where he attended Bradley University. He subsequently studied at University of North Texas College of Music and Indiana University, where he studied with bel-canto soprano, Virginia Zeani and bass, Nicola Rossi-Lemeni. He later studied with tenor legends Franco Corelli and James King. In New York, he won the Liederkranz Competition, received a Citation of Excellence from the Birgit Nilsson Prize Competition, won five study grants from the New York Wagner Society, and received a fellowship from Jerome Hines Opera-Music Theatre Institute. He is on the voice faculty of New Jersey City University.

Roles
Mark Nicolson's roles included:
 European debut as Tamino The Magic Flute: Dublin Grand Opera.
 American debut as Don Ottavio Don Giovanni: Virginia Opera
 Cavaradossi in Tosca: Atlanta Opera, Palacio de Belles Artes (Mexico City), Opera Quebec.
 Faust in Faust: New Orleans Opera, Central City Opera, Mercury Theatre (New Zealand), Hong Kong Opera.
 Des Grieux in Manon: Seoul, Korea
 Male Chorus in The Rape of Lucretia (Britten): Wolf Trap Opera
 Tamino The Magic Flute: Hong Kong Opera.
 Pirro in Ermione (Rossini, American stage premiere): Opera Omaha
 Gernando in Armida (Rossini) Minnesota Opera
 Pinkerton in Madama Butterfly: Opera North (Leeds, England), Mississippi Opera.
 Alfredo in La Traviata: Opera Omaha
 Lennie in Of Mice and Men Carlisle Floyd : Opera Grand Rapids
 Radames in Aida: Opera Illinois
 Bacchus in Ariadne auf Naxos: New Orleans Opera

Orchestral
 Verdi Requiem with the Philharmonia Orchestra, Chichester Festival
 Mahler 8th Symphony with the Connecticut Symphony

Television
 Late Show with David Letterman 2003

References

External links

Musicians from Peoria, Illinois
American operatic tenors
Bradley University alumni
Jacobs School of Music alumni
University of North Texas College of Music alumni
Living people
Year of birth missing (living people)
New Jersey City University faculty
Classical musicians from Illinois
Singers from Illinois